Gary Arlen Kildall (May 19, 1942 – July 11, 1994) was an American computer scientist and microcomputer entrepreneur.

During the 1970s, Kildall created the CP/M operating system among other operating systems and programming tools, and subsequently founded Digital Research, Inc. (or "DRI") to market and sell his software products. Kildall was among the earliest individuals to recognize microprocessors as fully capable computers (rather than simply as equipment controllers), and to organize a company around this concept. Due to his accomplishments during this era, Kildall is considered a pioneer of the personal computer revolution.

During the 1980s, Kildall also appeared on PBS as co-host (with Stewart Cheifet) of Computer Chronicles, a weekly informational program which covered the latest developments in personal computing.

Although Kildall's entrepreneurial career in computing spanned more than two decades, he is mainly remembered in connection with his development of the CP/M operating system, an early multi-platform microcomputer OS that has many parallels to the later MS-DOS used on the IBM PC.

Early life 
Gary Kildall was born and grew up in Seattle, Washington, where his family operated a seamanship school. His father, Joseph Kildall, was a captain of Norwegian heritage. His mother Emma was of half Swedish descent, as Kildall's grandmother was born in Långbäck, Sweden, in Skellefteå Municipality, but emigrated to Canada at 23 years of age.

A self-described "greaser" during high school, Kildall later attended the University of Washington (UW), hoping to become a mathematics teacher. During his studies, Kildall became increasingly interested in computer technology. After receiving his degree in 1972, he fulfilled a draft obligation to the United States Navy by teaching at the Naval Postgraduate School (NPS) in Monterey, California. Being within an hour's drive of Silicon Valley, Kildall heard about the first commercially available microprocessor, the Intel 4004. He bought one of the processors and began writing experimental programs for it. To learn more about the processors, he worked at Intel as a consultant on his days off.

Kildall briefly returned to UW and finished his doctorate in computer science in 1972, then resumed teaching at NPS. He published a paper that introduced the theory of data-flow analysis used today in optimizing compilers (sometimes known as Kildall's method), and he continued to experiment with microcomputers and the emerging technology of floppy disks. Intel lent him systems using the 8008 and 8080 processors, and in 1973, he developed the first high-level programming language for microprocessors, called PL/M. For Intel he also wrote an 8080 instruction set simulator named INTERP/80. He created CP/M the same year to enable the 8080 to control a floppy drive, combining for the first time all the essential components of a computer at the microcomputer scale. He demonstrated CP/M to Intel, but Intel had little interest and chose to market PL/M instead.

Business career

CP/M 
Kildall and his wife Dorothy established a company, originally called "Intergalactic Digital Research" (later renamed as Digital Research, Inc.), to market CP/M through advertisements in hobbyist magazines. Digital Research licensed CP/M for the IMSAI 8080, a popular clone of the Altair 8800. As more manufacturers licensed CP/M, it became a de facto standard and had to support an increasing number of hardware variations. In response, Kildall pioneered the concept of a BIOS, a set of simple programs stored in the computer hardware (ROM or EPROM chip) that enabled CP/M to run on different systems without modification.

CP/M's quick success took Kildall by surprise, and he was slow to update it for high density floppy disks and hard disk drives. After hardware manufacturers talked about creating a rival operating system, Kildall started a rush project to develop CP/M 2. By 1981, at the peak of its popularity, CP/M ran on  different computer models and DRI had  million in yearly revenues.

IBM dealings 
IBM approached Digital Research in 1980, at Bill Gates' suggestion, to negotiate the purchase of a forthcoming version of CP/M called CP/M-86 for the IBM PC. Gary had left negotiations to his wife, Dorothy, as he usually did, while he and colleague and developer of MP/M operating system Tom Rolander used Gary's private aeroplane to deliver software to manufacturer Bill Godbout. Before the IBM representatives would explain the purpose of their visit, they insisted that Dorothy sign a non-disclosure agreement. On the advice of DRI attorney Gerry Davis, Dorothy refused to sign the agreement without Gary's approval. Gary returned in the afternoon and tried to move the discussion with IBM forward, and accounts disagree on whether he signed the non-disclosure agreement, as well as if he ever met with the IBM representatives.

Various reasons have been given for the two companies failing to reach an agreement. DRI, which had only a few products, might have been unwilling to sell its main product to IBM for a one-time payment rather than its usual royalty-based plan. Dorothy might have believed that the company could not deliver CP/M-86 on IBM's proposed schedule, as the company was busy developing an implementation of the PL/I programming language for Data General. Also possible, the IBM representatives might have been annoyed that DRI had spent hours on what they considered a routine formality. According to Kildall, the IBM representatives took the same flight to Florida that night that he and Dorothy took for their vacation, and they negotiated further on the flight, reaching a handshake agreement. IBM lead negotiator Jack Sams insisted that he never met Gary, and one IBM colleague has confirmed that Sams said so at the time. He accepted that someone else in his group might have been on the same flight, and noted that he flew back to Seattle to talk with Microsoft again.

Sams related the story to Gates, who had already agreed to provide a BASIC interpreter and several other programs for the PC. Gates' impression of the story was that Gary capriciously "went flying", as he would later tell reporters. Sams left Gates with the task of finding a usable operating system, and a few weeks later he proposed using the operating system 86-DOS—an independently developed operating system that implemented Kildall's CP/M API—from Seattle Computer Products (SCP). Paul Allen negotiated a licensing deal with SCP. Allen had 86-DOS adapted for IBM's hardware, and IBM shipped it as IBM PC DOS.

Kildall obtained a copy of PC DOS, examined it, and concluded that it infringed on CP/M. When he asked Gerry Davis what legal options were available, Davis told him that intellectual property law for software was not clear enough to sue. Instead Kildall only threatened IBM with legal action, and IBM responded with a proposal to offer CP/M-86 as an option for the PC in return for a release of liability. Kildall accepted, believing that IBM's new system (like its previous personal computers) would not be a significant commercial success. When the IBM PC was introduced, IBM sold its operating system as an unbundled option. PC DOS was seen as a practically necessary option; most software titles required it and without it the IBM PC was limited to its built-in Cassette BASIC.

Later work 
With the loss of the IBM deal, Gary and Dorothy found themselves under pressure to bring in more experienced management, and Gary's influence over the company waned. He worked in various experimental and research projects, such as a version of CP/M with multitasking (MP/M) and an implementation of the Logo programming language. He hoped that Logo, an educational dialect of LISP, would supplant BASIC in education, but it did not. After seeing a demonstration of the Apple Lisa, Kildall oversaw the creation of DRI's own graphical user interface, called GEM. Novell acquired DRI in 1991 in a deal that netted millions for Kildall.

Kildall resigned as CEO of Digital Research on 28 June 1985, but remained chairman of the board.

Kildall also pursued computing-related projects outside DRI. During the seven years from 1983 to 1990 he co-hosted a public television program on the side, called Computer Chronicles, that followed trends in personal computing.

In 1984 he started another company, Activenture, which adapted optical disc technology for computer use. In early 1985 it was renamed KnowledgeSet and released the first computer encyclopedia in June 1985, a CD-ROM version of Grolier's Academic American Encyclopedia named The Electronic Encyclopedia, later acquired by Banta Corporation. Kildall's final business venture, known as Prometheus Light and Sound (PLS) and based in Austin, Texas, developed a modular PBX communication system that integrated land-line telephones with mobile phones (called "Intelliphone") to reduce the then-high online costs and to remotely connect with home appliances. It included a UUCP-based store and forward system to exchange emails and files between the various nodes and was planned to include TCP/IP support at a later point in time.

Personal life 
Kildall's colleagues recall him as creative, easygoing, and adventurous. In addition to flying, he loved sports cars, auto racing, and boating, and had a lifelong love of the sea.

Although Kildall preferred to leave the IBM affair in the past and to be known for his work before and afterward, he continually faced comparisons between himself and Bill Gates, as well as fading memories of his contributions. A legend grew around the fateful IBM-DRI meeting, encouraged by Gates and various journalists, suggesting that Kildall had irresponsibly taken the day off for a recreational flight.

In later years, Kildall privately expressed bitter feelings about being overshadowed by Microsoft, and began suffering from alcoholism.

Selling DRI to Novell had made Kildall a wealthy man, and he moved to the West Lake Hills suburb of Austin. His Austin house was a lakeside property, with stalls for several sports cars, and a video studio in the basement. Kildall owned and flew his own Learjet and had at least one boat on the lake. While in Austin he also participated in volunteer efforts to assist children with HIV/AIDS. He also owned a mansion with a panoramic ocean view in Pebble Beach, California, near the headquarters of DRI.

Computer Connections 
In 1992, Kildall was invited to the University of Washington computer science program's 25th anniversary event. As a distinguished graduate of the program, Kildall was disappointed when asked to attend simply as an audience member. He also took offense at the decision to give the keynote speech to Bill Gates, a Harvard dropout who had donated to UW, but had never attended.

In response, Kildall began writing a memoir, entitled Computer Connections: People, Places, and Events in the Evolution of the Personal Computer Industry. The memoir, which Kildall sought to publish, expressed his frustration that people did not seem to value elegance in computer software. 

Writing about Bill Gates, Kildall described him as "more of an opportunist than a technical type, and severely opinionated, even when the opinion he holds is absurd."

In an appendix, he called DOS "plain and simple theft" because its first 26 system calls worked the same as CP/M's. He accused IBM of contriving the price difference between PC DOS and CP/M-86 in order to marginalize CP/M.

Kildall had completed a rough draft of the manuscript by the end of 1993, but the full text remains unpublished.  Journalist Harold Evans used the memoir as a primary source for a chapter about Kildall in the 2004 book They Made America, concluding that Microsoft had robbed Kildall of his inventions. IBM veterans from the PC project disputed the book's description of events, and Microsoft described it as "one-sided and inaccurate."

In August 2016, Kildall's family made the first seven chapters of Computer Connections available as a free public download.

Death 
On July 8, 1994, at the age of 52, Kildall sustained a head injury at the Franklin Street Bar & Grill, a biker bar in Monterey, California. The exact circumstances of the injury are unclear. Various sources have claimed he fell from a chair, fell down steps, or was assaulted because he had entered the establishment wearing Harley-Davidson leathers. Harold Evans, in They Made America, states that Kildall "stumbled and hit his head" inside the premises, and "was found on the floor."

Following the injury, Kildall was discharged from the hospital twice. He was pronounced dead at the Community Hospital of the Monterey Peninsula, on July 11, 1994.

An autopsy, conducted on July 12, did not conclusively determine the cause of death. Evans states that Kildall's head injury triggered a cerebral hemorrhage, causing a blood clot to form inside the skull. A CP/M Usenet FAQ states that Kildall was concussed due to his injury, and died of a heart attack; the connection between the two is unclear.

Initial news reports and police investigation viewed Kildall's death as a possible homicide. According to the coroner's report, Kildall's fatal injury may have taken place "as a result of foul play," and the case was referred to the Monterey Police Department. "We're going to investigate it as a possible homicide," said police Sgt. Frank Sollecito. "I'm not going to flat-out say it's a homicide."

Kildall's body was cremated. His remains were buried in Evergreen Washelli Memorial Park, in north Seattle.

Recognition 
Following the announcement of Kildall's death, Bill Gates commented that he was "one of the original pioneers of the PC revolution" and "a very creative computer scientist who did excellent work. Although we were competitors, I always had tremendous respect for his contributions to the PC industry. His untimely death was very unfortunate and his work will be missed."

In March 1995, Kildall was posthumously honored by the Software Publishers Association (SPA) for his contributions to the microcomputer industry:

 The first programming language and first compiler specifically for microprocessors: PL/M. (1973)
 The first microprocessor disk operating system, which eventually sold a quarter of a million copies: CP/M. (1974)
 The first successful open system architecture by segregating system-specific hardware interfaces in a set of BIOS routines. (1975)
 Creation of the first diskette track buffering schemes, read-ahead algorithms, file directory caches, and RAM drive emulators.
 Introduction of operating systems with preemptive multitasking and windowing capabilities and menu-driven user interfaces (with Digital Research): MP/M, Concurrent CP/M, Concurrent DOS, DOS Plus, GEM.
 Introduction of a binary recompiler: XLT86. (1981)
 The first computer interface for video disks to allow automatic nonlinear playback, presaging today's interactive multimedia. (1984, with Activenture)
 The file system and data structures for the first consumer CD-ROM. (1985, with KnowledgeSet)

In April 2014, the city of Pacific Grove installed a commemorative plaque outside Kildall's former residence, which also served as the early headquarters of Digital Research.

See also 

 History of personal computers
 John Q. Torode

References

Further reading 
  
 
 
 
  (Part 2 not released due to family privacy reasons.)
 
  (18 pages)

External links 

 
 

1942 births
1994 deaths
American computer programmers
American computer scientists
American computer businesspeople
American technology company founders
American technology chief executives

Digital Research people
Digital Research employees
CP/M people
Naval Postgraduate School faculty
Scientists from Seattle
University of Washington alumni
American people of Norwegian descent
Accidental deaths from falls
20th-century American businesspeople
Death conspiracy theories
People from Pebble Beach, California
American television hosts